Earl Lee Hogan (March 13, 1920 – June 3, 2007) was an American World War II veteran who served a term as a U.S. Representative from Indiana from 1959 to 1961.

He was born and died in Hope, Indiana.

Early life
Hogan attended public school in Burney, Indiana and later, Indiana University and the University of Kentucky.

As World War II approached Hogan enlisted in the United States Army Air Corps (1940) and remained in the service until 1945. He saw action as bombardier on the B-17 Flying Fortress, eventually receiving a Distinguished Flying Cross, a Purple Heart, and an Air Medal with three Oak Clusters.

Postwar career
Returning from military service, Hogan was appointed Deputy Sheriff of Bartholomew County, Indiana (1946–50), then successfully ran for Sheriff of the same county for two terms (1950–58).

Approaching the end of his second term as Sheriff, Hogan chose to run as a Democrat for the US House of Representatives, representing the Indiana Ninth District (1958). He was successful, and served in the 86th Session (January 1959 – 1961). After losing a re-election bid in 1960, he remained in Washington D.C.

He served as assistant to the administrator of the Farmers Home Administration in 1961. He served as assistant to the administrator of the Rural Electric Administration from 1961-62. He served as Midwest field representative in the Office of Rural Areas Development from 1962-66. He served as Rural development specialist from 1966–70, special projects representative from 1971–75, chief of business and industrial loan division from 1975–80, all in Farmers Home Administration.

In 1966 Hogan also returned to Indiana State government service, serving as the secretary of the Indiana State Rural Development Committee from 1966 to 1980. He served as chairman of the State advisory board, Indiana Green Thumb, Inc. from 1975-82.

Personal life
He was married to Alma Guy Benthal who died in 2000. Hogan died in 2007, aged 87. He was survived by six children, eight grandchildren, and two great grandchildren.

References

Citations

References

External links

 
 
 
 

1920 births
2007 deaths
People from Bartholomew County, Indiana
United States Army Air Forces officers
United States Army Air Forces personnel of World War II
Recipients of the Air Medal
Recipients of the Distinguished Flying Cross (United States)
Democratic Party members of the United States House of Representatives from Indiana
20th-century American politicians